Grevillea pinifolia, commonly known as the pine-leaved grevillea,<ref name=FB>{{FloraBase|name=Grevillea pinifolia|id=2067}}</ref> is a species of flowering plant in the family Proteaceae and is endemic to a restricted area in the south-west of Western Australia. It is a low, mounded shrub with linear, more or less cylindrical leaves and red to orange-red flowers.

The edges of the leaves are rolled under to the mid-vein with two longitudinal grooves either side.

TaxonomyGrevillea pinifolia was first formally described in 1856 by Carl Meissner in de Candolle's Prodromus Systematis Naturalis Regni Vegetabilis from specimens collected in the Swan River Colony by James Drummond. The specific epithet (pinifolia'') means "pine-leaved".

Distribution and habitat
Pine-leaved grevillea grows in shrubland and is restricted to a small area between Eneabba and Bindi Bindi in the Avon Wheatbelt bioregion of south-western Western Australia.

Conservation status
This grevillea is listed as "Priority One" by the Government of Western Australia Department of Biodiversity, Conservation and Attractions, meaning that it is known from only one or a few locations which are potentially at risk.

See also
 List of Grevillea species

References

pinifolia
Endemic flora of Western Australia
Eudicots of Western Australia
Proteales of Australia
Taxa named by Carl Meissner
Plants described in 1856